Lobochilotes labiatus is a species of fish endemic to Lake Tanganyika. It is currently the only known species in its genus.

See also
List of freshwater aquarium fish species

References

 
Monotypic fish genera
Taxa named by George Albert Boulenger
Taxonomy articles created by Polbot